The 1976 La Flèche Wallonne was the 40th edition of La Flèche Wallonne cycle race and was held on 15 April 1976. The race started and finished in Verviers. The race was won by Joop Zoetemelk of the Gan–Mercier team.

General classification

References

1976 in road cycling
1976
1976 in Belgian sport
1976 Super Prestige Pernod
April 1976 sports events in Europe